Associazione Sportiva Dilettantistica Flaminia Civita Castellana is an Italian association football club located in Civita Castellana, Lazio. It currently plays in Serie D.

History 
The club was founded in 2008 after the merger of A.S.D. Bassano Romano and A.S. Sassacci of Civita Castellana.

Colors and badge 
Its colors are red and blue.

References

External links 
Official homepage

Football clubs in Italy
Football clubs in Lazio
Association football clubs established in 2008
2008 establishments in Italy